Corporate Warriors may refer to:

 Corporate Warriors: The Rise of the Privatized Military Industry, a book by P. W. Singer
 "Corporate Warriors" (CSI: NY), an episode of CSI: NY